Jassie Gift is an Indian film music composer and playback singer. He composes songs and sings for Malayalam, Kannada, Tamil and Telugu films. He became famous after the success of his song "Lajjavathiye" from the film 4 The People.
He won the Best Music Director award at The Bangalore Times Film Awards 2011.

Biography

Hailing from Vithura, Gift was born to Gift Israel and Rajamma. He was interested in music from childhood and was highly influenced by western music. He admired Ilayaraja and was a fan of Freddie Mercury. He had lessons in western piano from a young age and started singing and playing the keyboard in local bands. He is a singer and keyboard player of the band Moby Dick.

He entered the film music industry under the guidance of director Jayaraj. Before entering films he composed songs for a couple of albums in Malayalam, including the hit album Soona Soona, and also composed singles. He pioneered the use of reggae fusion music in the Malayalam music industry with the backing roots of Indian ragas. Gift's first film composition was for the movie Saphalam. His songs written for the movie 4 The People became hits in Kerala, especially "Lajjavathiye", and his music contributed to the success of the film, which became 2004's biggest Malayalam film. The film was later remade in Tamil, and also as Malliswarive in Telugu The song was successful in all languages.

Gift mixed Indian and western music on the album, Rain, Rain Come again, as well as the music for the Kannada film Hudugaata, and the songs "Eno Onthara", "Mandakiniye" and "Ommomme Heegu". He has worked with many South Indian musicians such as Harris Jayaraj, Devisri Prasad, Yuvan Shankar Raja, and M M Keeravani, and Anirudh Ravichander, and collaborated with many music directors from south India. He composed songs for the movie Sanju Weds Githa, sung by Shreya Ghoshal and Sonu Nigam.

Jassie Gift has a master's degree in Philosophy from University College, Trivandrum, and a PhD in Philosophy from Kannur University on the topic of "The Philosophy of Harmony and Bliss with Reference to Advaita and Buddhism".

Personal life
On 12 September 2012, Jassie married Dr Athulya, who accomplished a PhD in Information Technology/Physics from Kannur University. On 24 December 2021, Jassie Gift has been appointed as chairman of Kerala State Development Corporation for Christian Converts.

Filmography

As a composer

As a singer

Kannada songs

Malayalam songs

Tamil songs

Telugu songs

References

External links 
 
 Hits of Jassi Gift

Indian male playback singers
Malayalam film score composers
Kannada film score composers
Tamil film score composers
Telugu film score composers
Kannada playback singers
Malayalam playback singers
Filmfare Awards South winners
Singers from Thiruvananthapuram
Living people
Tamil playback singers
Telugu playback singers
21st-century Indian singers
Film musicians from Kerala
Indian male film score composers
21st-century Indian male singers
1975 births